The EF 70–200mm lenses are a group of telephoto zoom full-frame lenses made by Canon. The lenses have an EF mount to work with the EOS line of cameras.

The lens comes in seven different versions, all of which have fixed maximum aperture at all focal lengths, and are L-series lenses.

 f/4L USM
 f/4L IS USM
 f/4L IS II USM
 f/2.8L USM
 f/2.8L IS USM
 f/2.8L IS II USM
 f/2.8L IS III USM

The latest iterations of both the f/4 and the f/2.8 variants were announced on 7 June 2018.  The f/4 is currently under production and the original MSRP was increased from US$1,299 to US$1,499. In March 2021, it was reported that Canon had decided to discontinue the lens.

Common fields of application 
The f/4 USM is popular among weight-sensitive landscape photographers and hobbyists who want L lens quality without spending thousands of dollars. The f/2.8 versions are popular among event photographers and photojournalists where the lens's lower light capabilities are required. Some portrait photographers also prefer this lens because the fast aperture produces more background blur and bokeh.

The non-IS f/2.8 version was released in 1995 and replaced the EF 80–200mm f/2.8L. The lenses use nine- or eight-bladed, circular diaphragms which maintain a nearly circular aperture when stopped down. The f/2.8 and f/4.0 image-stabilized versions also feature weather sealing when mated to a weather-sealed camera to such as the Canon EOS 1D-series bodies. These lenses are compatible with the Canon Extender EF teleconverters. Due to its internal zooming mechanism, the lens does not creep or zoom when pointed downward.

35-mm-equivalent focal lengths on cameras with smaller sensors 
When used with a Canon APS-C (1.6x crop) DSLR camera or APS-H (1.3x crop), the 35-mm-equivalent focal lengths of these lenses are 112–320mm on an APS-C sensor and 91–260mm on an APS-H sensor. This is due to the crop factor inherent with APS-C or APS-H (crop) sensor digital SLR cameras.

Switches
A frequently pointed-out problem with this lens is the placement of the IS and AF switches, which make them prone to accidental flipping during hand-held shooting. Some photographers solve this by covering the buttons with a piece of gaffer tape. In recognition of this issue, starting with the f/4L IS USM model and f/2.8L IS II USM lens, Canon uses switches designed to reduce the incidence of accidental switch activation.

Specifications

References

External links

Official links
Canon EF 70–200mm 2.8L IS III USM
Canon EF 70–200mm 2.8L IS II USM
Canon EF 70–200mm 2.8L IS USM
Canon EF 70–200mm 2.8L USM
Canon EF 70–200mm 4L IS II USM
Canon EF 70–200mm 4L IS USM
Canon EF 70–200mm 4L USM

Canon EF lenses
Canon L-Series lenses